Matthew Thornton was a signer of the US Declaration of Independence.

Matthew Thornton  or Matt Thornton may also refer to:

Matt Thornton (baseball) (born 1976), Major League Baseball relief pitcher
Matt Thornton (martial artist) (born 1969), martial artist and founder of Straight Blast Gym
Matthew Thornton Elementary School
Matthew Thornton House
SS Matthew Thornton, see List of Liberty ships
Matthew Thornton, Sr., see Beale Street
Matthew Thornton, mayor of Lambton, New South Wales